Pfitzneriana is a genus of moths of the family Hepialidae. There are four described species, all found in South America.

Species
Pfitzneriana allura - Bolivia
Pfitzneriana olivescens - Colombia
Pfitzneriana prosopus - Colombia
Pfitzneriana volgi - Venezuela

External links
Hepialidae genera

Hepialidae
Taxa named by Pierre Viette
Exoporia genera